Aleksandar Radosavljević may refer to:
 Aleksandar Radosavljević (footballer, born 1979), Slovenian football midfielder
 Aleksandar Radosavljević (footballer born 1982), Serbian football goalkeeper
 Aleksandar Radosavljević, mixed martial artist, opponent of Jan Błachowicz